The Ichera ( or Ичёра) is a river in Irkutsk Oblast, Russia.

The river flows across an uninhabited area of the Kirensky District. Ichera village is located by the left bank of the Lena, a little upstream from the confluence.

Course  
The Ichera is a left tributary of the Lena. It is formed in the western part of the Lena Plateau. The river heads in a roughly southeastern direction across a taiga area.

The river freezes yearly between October and May.

See also
Lena Cheeks
List of rivers of Russia

References

External links 
река Ичера

Central Siberian Plateau
Rivers of Irkutsk Oblast